Argyrotaenia pinatubana, the pine tube moth,  is a species of moth of the family Tortricidae. It is found in eastern North America, from Canada south to Florida and west to Wisconsin.

The wingspan is 12–17 mm.
The forewings are reddish-orange with two off-white oblique lines. The hindwings are smoky coloured. There are two generations per each year.

The larvae mainly feed on Pinus strobus. They are pale green larvae and can reach a length of about 12 mm. Young larvae spin silk and tie five to twenty pine needles together to form a tube. The larvae live within this tube. When the tube walls have been mostly eaten down, the larvae will abandon their tubes and begin constructing new ones. The species overwinters in the pupal stage within the tube.

References

Moths described in 1905
pinatubana
Moths of North America